Cindy is a feminine given name. Originally diminutive (or hypocorism) of Cynthia, Lucinda or Cinderella, it is also commonly used as a name on its own right. The name can also be spelled as Cindee, Cyndee, Syndee, Sindee, Sindi, Syndi, Syndy, Cindi, Cyndi, Cyndy and Sindy. From 1953 to 1973 it was among top 100 most common female given names.

People

Cindy 
Cindy Amaiza, Kenyan HIV/AIDS activist
Akino "Cindy" Kawamitsu (born 1989), American-born Japanese singer
Cindy Bass (born 1967), American politician
Cindy Birdsong (born 1939), American singer and songwriter
Cindy Bishop (born 1978), Thai model, actress, TV personality and entrepreneur
Cindy Blackman Santana (born 1959), American drummer
Cindy Bortz, American figure skater, 1987 world junior champion
Cindy Bouque (born 1975), Belgian female shooter
Cindy Breakspeare (born 1954), Jamaican model and partner of the reggae musician Robert Marley
Cindy Carquillat (born 1986), Swiss figure skater
Cindy Chupack, American screenwriter and film director
Cindy Crawford (born 1966), American model
Cindy Dandois (born 1984), Belgian mixed martial artist
Cindy Davis (born 1977), American bicycle motocross (BMX) racer
Cindy Estrada, American trade union leader
Cindy Greiner (born 1957), American heptathlete and long jumper
Cindy Herron (born 1961), American singer, songwriter, model and actress
Cindy Hyde-Smith (born 1959), American politician serving as the junior United States senator from Mississippi
Cindy Jackson (born 1957), American singer, record holder for cosmetic surgery
Cindy Jaynes (born 1959), American rear admiral
Cindy Jebb, United States Army brigadier general who currently serves as the 14th dean of the United States Military Academy
Cindy Klassen (born 1979), Canadian speed skater
Cindy Kleine, American film director, producer and video artist
Cindy Kurleto, Austrian model, actress, and a former MTV VJ in the Philippines
Cindy May McGuire (born 1996), Indonesian beauty pageant titleholder
Cindy McCain (born 1954), American businesswoman, wife of US Senator John McCain
Cindy Meehl, American documentary filmmaker and director
Cindy Nelson (born 1955), American alpine ski racer
Cindy Ninos (born 1972), Greek skeleton racer
Cindy Noble (born 1958), American basketball player
Cindy O'Callaghan (born 1956), British actress
Cindy Parlow Cone (born 1978), American former soccer player and head coach
Cindy Pieters (born 1976), Belgian racing cyclist
Cindy Robinson (born 1973), American voice actress
Cindy Rondón (born 1988), Dominican volleyball player
Cindy Sampson (born 1978), Canadian film and television actress
Cindy Sanyu (born 1985), Ugandan musician
Cindy Sheehan (born 1957), American anti-war activist
Cindy Shelley (born 1960), British actress
Cindy Sherman (born 1954), American photographer and film director
Cindy Silvestre (born 1993), French kickboxer
Cindy Valentine, Italian born Canadian singer and actress
Cindy Vela (born 1979), American actress, model, and saxophonist
Cindy Walker (1918–2006), American songwriter, singer and dancer
Cindy Whitehead (born 1962), American skateboarder
Cindy Williams (1947–2023), American actress
Cindy Wilson (born 1957), American singer with The B-52s
Cindy Yen (born 1986), Taiwanese actress

Cindi
Cindi Cain, Canadian country music singer
Cindi Katz (born 1954), American geographer and CUNY Graduate Center professor
Cindi Leive (born 1967), American journalist and writer, Editor in Chief of Glamour magazine
Cindi Love, American entrepreneur and businessperson

Cyndi
Cyndi Almouzni (born 1984), French pop singer also known as Cherie
Cyndi Grecco (born 1952), American singer
Cyndi Lauper (born 1953), American singer-songwriter and actress
Cyndi Wang (born 1982), Taiwanese pop singer and actress
Cynthia Wood (born 1950), American model and actress, 1974 Playboy Playmate of the Year

Cyndy
Cyndy Brucato (born 1951), American journalist and former news anchor
Cyndy Garvey (born 1949), American TV personality and former wife of baseball player Steve Garvey
Cyndy Violette (born 1959), American professional poker player

Fictional characters
Cindy in Commando
 Cindy, short name for Cinderella in 1978 television film Cindy
 Cindy Bear in Hanna-Barbera cartoons
 Cindy Brady in TV show The Brady Bunch 
 Cindy Collins, a.k.a. Princess, in the live-action film Zoom
 Cindy Cunningham in the British soap opera Hollyoaks
 Cindy Decker (later known as Cindy Decker Kutiel) in a series of mystery novels by Faye Kellerman
 Cindy Snow in Three's Company
 Cindy Vortex in The Adventures of Jimmy Neutron, Boy Genius
 Cindy Lou Who in Dr. Seuss' book How the Grinch Stole Christmas!
Cindy Turner is the wife of Gregory Turner, and mother of Derek and Jeanette Turner in Freeform's 2021 miniseries Cruel Summer
 Cindy Moon, aka Silk from Marvel Comics

See also
Sindy (doll)
Cindy (disambiguation)
Cindy-Lu Bailey, Australian Deaflympic swimmer

Names with a similar meaning
Other names also meaning "light":
 Robert 
 Albert 
 Herbert 
 Humbert
 Bertrand 
 Walter / Walther
 Waldemar/Vladimir
 Adolf
 Julian
 Lucas / Luke / Lucius

References

English feminine given names
Feminine given names
Hypocorisms